In Pit Lane is an Australian motor sports television show produced in conjunction with RMITV currently broadcasting on C31 Melbourne in Melbourne, Australia with the support of Online Invent a Melbourne based SEO and Web Design Company. In Pit Lane began in 1996 on the now defunct OptusVision service before moving to C31 in 1999.

The program is produced and staffed entirely from volunteer members of Melbourne Student Community Television Inc. trading as RMITV.

Brett Ramsey, the Producer and Host of the show created In Pit Lane as a short term project while recovering from a serious back injury.

That was over 26 years ago. A news series of the show will commence on March 9, 2023.

References

External links
 Official site

2000s Australian television series
2010s Australian television series
Television shows set in Victoria (Australia)
Australian community access television shows
English-language television shows
1996 Australian television series debuts
RMITV productions